The HSS Journal, the Musculoskeletal Journal of Hospital for Special Surgery is a peer-reviewed medical journal published by Springer Science+Business Media. It covers musculoskeletal diseases and orthopedic surgery. The journal offers free continuing medical education articles without registration. The editor in chief is Charles N. Cornell (Weill Cornell Medical College of Cornell University).

References

External links 
 
  Hospital for Special Surgery

Springer Science+Business Media academic journals
Biannual journals
Orthopedics journals
English-language journals
Publications established in 2005